Bar Aftab-e Heydarqoli (also Romanized as Bar Āftāb-e Ḩeydarqolī; also known as Barāftāb) is a village in Chelo Rural District, Chelo District, Andika County, Khuzestan Province, Iran. At the 2006 census, its population was 115, in 20 families.

References 

Populated places in Andika County